Down Among the Dead Men is a Swedish/Danish death metal band. Formed by lead vocalist Dave Ingram (ex-Benediction, ex-Bolt Thrower, Hail of Bullets) and guitarist Rogga Johansson (Paganizer, Ribspreader, Revolting, etc.). Their musical style has been specified as "crust-riddled punk with a definite death metal edge".

Band members
Current members
Dave Ingram - vocals (2013–present)
Rogga Johansson - guitar, bass (2013–present)
Dennis Blomberg - guitar (2013–present)

Former members
Brynjar Helgetun - drums (2013)

Tour members
Matthias Fiebig - drums (2013–present)

Discography
Studio albums
Down Among the Dead Men (2013)
Exterminate! Annihilate! Destroy! (2015)
…And You Will Obey Me (2018)

References

External links

Musical groups established in 2013
Swedish death metal musical groups
Danish death metal musical groups
Swedish crust and d-beat groups